Alexis Amore (born Fabiola Melgar García; 29 December 1978) is a Peruvian pornographic actress and feature dancer. In 2018, she was inducted into the AVN Hall of Fame.

Early life
Amore was born in Lima, Peru. Her first language is Spanish. At age 9, she moved to the United States. She was raised in Redondo Beach, California and attended high school in Hermosa Beach. She once worked as a nurse at a Catholic hospital in California.

Career
Amore worked as a model and host for Playboy TV shortly before debuting in porn. She was discovered on an episode of Night Calls. She entered the adult film industry in 1999 and did her first scene for The Watcher 6 from Vivid Entertainment. In 2001, she took a one-year hiatus from performing, during which she continued feature dancing, and returned in the summer of 2002.

In March 2003, Amore became a contract performer for Jill Kelly Productions. Shortly after her contract with JKP ended, she signed a performing and directing contract with Anabolic Video in June 2004. Once her deal with Anabolic Video ended, she became an exclusive contract performer and spokesperson for Video Team in September 2005. She made her debut for the company in the film All About Alexis. In September 2006, she decided not to renew her contract with Video Team.

In June 2004, Frecuencia Latina filmed a documentary on her for the show Reporte Semanal. In March 2006, Amore appeared on the Spanish language television shows No te Duermas and El Poder in Puerto Rico. Amore was featured on the cover of the September 2006 issue of Lowrider. In January 2008, Amore announced that she would resume performing in boy/girl sex scenes after two years of only working with other women.

Other ventures
On October 22, 2014, she launched a show titled That's Amore on Vivid Radio. On December 7, 2004, Amore debuted as a columnist on AVN Insider with a column titled "Simply Alexis". She had previously written a sex advice column for the mainstream Peruvian magazine Oye.

Awards

References

External links

 
 
 
 

1978 births
American columnists
American female adult models
American female erotic dancers
American erotic dancers
American nurses
American women nurses
American pornographic film actresses
American pornographic film directors
Hispanic and Latino American pornographic film actors
Living people
People from Lima
People from Redondo Beach, California
Peruvian female models
Peruvian pornographic film actresses
Pornographic film actors from California
Radio personalities from California
Women pornographic film directors
Film directors from California
American women columnists
Peruvian emigrants to the United States
21st-century American women